Geoffrey Paul Jenkins (born 5 March 1938) is a former Australian politician.

He was born in Ballarat and attended Redan Primary School and Ballarat High School. In 1952 he took an apprenticeship with H. L. Pullen, but in 1958 underwent national service. On his return, as an electrical mechanic, he worked for a number of companies until becoming a self-employed contractor and company director in 1961. In 1985 he was elected to Sebastopol Borough Council, serving until 1993 (and as mayor from 1989 to 1990). In 1992 he was elected to the Victorian Legislative Assembly as the Liberal member for Ballarat West. He retired in 1999.

References

1938 births
Living people
Liberal Party of Australia members of the Parliament of Victoria
Members of the Victorian Legislative Assembly
People educated at Ballarat High School